Elfers is a census-designated place (CDP) in Pasco County, Florida, United States. The population was 13,161 at the 2000 census.

Geography
Elfers is located at  (28.216072, -82.722735).

Demographics

As of the census of 2000, there were 13,161 people, 5,701 households, and 3,563 families residing in the CDP. The racial makeup of the CDP was 95.19% White, 0.96% African American, 0.38% Native American, 0.91% Asian, 0.03% Pacific Islander, 0.93% from other races, and 1.60% from two or more races. Hispanic or Latino of any race were 4.52% of the population.

There were 5,701 households, out of which 23.3% had children under the age of 18 living with them, 47.6% were married couples living together, 11.1% had a female householder with no husband present, and 37.5% were non-families. 31.4% of all households were made up of individuals, and 20.0% had someone living alone who was 65 years of age or older.  The average household size was 2.23 and the average family size was 2.77.

In the CDP, the population was spread out, with 20.1% under the age of 18, 5.4% from 18 to 24, 24.5% from 25 to 44, 19.3% from 45 to 64, and 30.7% who were 65 years of age or older.  The median age was 45 years. For every 100 females, there were 82.7 males.  For every 100 females age 18 and over, there were 79.4 males.

The median income for a household in the CDP was $28,998, and the median income for a family was $31,735. Males had a median income of $27,536 versus $21,595 for females. The per capita income for the CDP was $15,801.  About 10.6% of families and 12.9% of the population were below the poverty line, including 17.1% of those under age 18 and 10.8% of those age 65 or over.

History
The area was known as the Baillie settlement until the Elfers post office was established on Dec. 14, 1909. Frieda Marie (Bolling) Eiland, the wife of the first postmaster, chose the name of the post office to honor a favorite uncle, whose last name was Elfers. Railroad service came to Elfers for the shipment of citrus in 1913. In 1915, the Elfers School opened; it was the first brick school in western Pasco County. A new building replaced it in 1966. The Elfers School red brick school has been converted into the Elfers CARES Center which celebrated a grand re-opening in 2013. The building now has a cafe, a "spacious auditorium", and is the home of the Avery Branch of the New Port Richey Public Library. Elfers was incorporated from 1925 to 1933.

References

External links
History of Elfers, Florida

Census-designated places in Pasco County, Florida
Census-designated places in Florida
Former municipalities in Florida